Edward Duchnowski (16 January 1930 in Podbiele – 10 April 2010) was a Polish activist.

He died in the 2010 Polish Air Force Tu-154 crash near Smolensk on 10 April 2010. He was posthumously awarded the Order of Polonia Restituta.

References

1930 births
2010 deaths
Polish activists
University of Warsaw alumni
Commanders with Star of the Order of Polonia Restituta
Victims of the Smolensk air disaster